Gert Volker Hildebrand (born 22 August 1953 in Lörrach) is a German car designer  and since 2011 is Head of Design at Qoros.

After studying mechanical engineering at TH Karlsruhe, Hildebrand then studied industrial design at the Braunschweig University of Art from 1975 to 1979, he studied transportation design at Royal College of Art in London in 1980.

Career
Hildebrand began his career with Opel in 1980, where he worked on the 1983 Kadett E. In 1986 he joined Volkswagen as Head of Concept Design, overseeing the development of the Golf III.

In 1989 he joined 3M as a design leader and in 1995 returned to the Volkswagen Group to become Alternate Head of Exterior Design at Volkswagen from 1994–1998, and in addition Head of Design at the SEAT Centro Tecnico in Martorell, Spain, from 1995 to 1996.

Hildebrand was appointed Chief Designer at Mitsubishi Design Europe in 1997 where he worked for three years. In 2001 he became General Manager of Mini Design, leading the Mini Countryman, Clubman and Coupé models.

In 2011, Hildebrand joined the new Chinese Israeli joint venture Chery Quantum Automotive Corporation, now called Qoros, as Head of Design.

Notable designs

Opel Junior concept
 Opel Kadett E
 Volkswagen Golf Mk3
 SEAT Leon
 Mini Countryman
 Mini Clubman
 Mini Coupé
 Qoros 3
 Qoros 5

References

1953 births
Living people
German automobile designers
Alumni of the Royal College of Art
Karlsruhe Institute of Technology alumni
Volkswagen Group designers
Opel designers
BMW designers